WRCZ-LD, virtual and UHF digital channel 35, is a low-powered Grit-affiliated television station serving Jacksonville, Florida, United States that is  licensed to Ocala. The station is owned by the DTV America Corporation, which also owns WKBJ-LD (channel 20) from Live Oak.

The station's transmission tower is located in the Brackridge neighborhood of Jacksonville's southeastern suburbs just off Florida State Road 115.

History 
While licensed to Ocala, Florida, the station's construction permit was issued under the callsign of W35CZ-D on February 11, 2011. The current WRCZ-LD calls were adapted on February 17, 2016.

In February 2016, DTV America Corporation, the station's owner, decided to relocate the station to the Jacksonville market before putting it on the air on June 23, 2016. This made the station DTV America's fifth television station to sign on in the state of Florida, and the organization's second station in the Jacksonville market as DTV America already signed Buzzr-affiliated, Live Oak-licensed WKBJ-LD on the air in that market.

In April 2017, Cheddar, a news TV channel, started broadcasting over the air with DTV America affiliating five stations including WRCZ-LD with the network. Dunkin' Donuts, a Cheddar advertiser, was handing out free digital antennas at events in the stations' markets to publicize the over the air launch.

Digital channels
The station's digital signal is multiplexed:

References

External links
DTV America Station list

Low-power television stations in the United States
RCZ-LD
Innovate Corp.
Grit (TV network) affiliates
Stadium (sports network) affiliates
Cozi TV affiliates
Comet (TV network) affiliates
Ion Mystery affiliates
Television channels and stations established in 2016